The Anatomy of Sharks is an EP by Louisville-based math rock band June of 44, released on January 21, 1997, by Quarterstick Records.

Track listing

Personnel
Adapted from The Anatomy of Sharks liner notes.

June of 44
 Fred Erskine – bass guitar, trumpet - track 2, vocals - track 3
 Sean Meadows – electric guitar, vocals
 Jeff Mueller – electric guitar, vocals
 Doug Scharin – drums

Production and additional personnel
 Bob Weston – production, recording, mixing

Release history

References

External links 
 

1996 EPs
June of 44 albums
Quarterstick Records EPs
Albums produced by Bob Weston